Wordhunt was a national appeal run by the Oxford English Dictionary, looking for earlier evidence of the use of 50 words and phrases in the English language. New evidence found by members of the public in response to the appeal appears in the Oxford English Dictionary. The appeal is a companion to the BBC2 television series Balderdash and Piffle.

First Wordhunt
The first Wordhunt was launched in 2005 by the Oxford English Dictionary and the BBC and resulted in the OED updating the entries of 34 words and phrases, featured in the first series of Balderdash and Piffle broadcast in early 2006.

The 50 words and phrases were:

balti 
Beeb 
bog standard 
bonk 
bouncy castle 
boffin 
bomber jacket 
Crimble 
chattering classes 
codswallop 
cyberspace
cyborg 
ditsy 
dosh 
full monty 
gas mark 
gay 
handbags at dawn 
her indoors 
jaffa 
Mackem 
made-up 
minger 
minted 
moony 
mullered 
mullet 
mushy peas 
naff 
nerd 
nip and tuck 
nit nurse 
nutmeg 
Old Bill 
on the pull 
pass the parcel 
pear-shaped 
phwoar 
pick 'n' mix 
ploughman's lunch 
pop one's clogs 
porky 
posh 
square one (back to...) 
ska 
smart casual 
snazzy 
something for the weekend 
to throw one's toys out of the pram
tikka masala

Second Wordhunt
The second Wordhunt was launched in January 2007, and the results  featured in a second series of Balderdash and Piffle, which was broadcast in Spring 2007.

The forty words and phrases, divided into six themes, are:

Man's Best Friend
dog and bone (1961)
the dog's bollocks (1989)
mucky pup (1984)
shaggy dog story (1946) *
sick puppy (1984)

Put Downs and Insults
plonker (1966)
prat (1968) *		
tosser (1977)
wally (1969)		
wazzock (1984)

Spend a Penny
domestic (1963) 
glamour model (1981)
loo (1940) *
regime change (1990)
whoopsie (1973)

Fashionistas
flip-flop (1970)	
hoodie (1990)
shell-suit  (1989)
stiletto (1959)				
trainer	(1978)

X Rated
dogging (1993) *
kinky (1959)
marital aid (1976)			
pole dance (1992)
wolf-whistle (1952)

One Sandwich Short
bananas (1968) *
bonkers (1957) *
daft (or mad) as a brush (1945) *
duh brain  (1997)
one sandwich short of a picnic (1993)

Who Were They?
Bloody Mary (1956) *
Gordon Bennett (1967) *
Jack the Lad (1981)
round robin (1988)
take the mickey (1948) *

Dodgy Dealings
bung (1958) *
Glasgow kiss (1987)
identity theft (1991)
spiv (1934) *
twoc (1990)

External links
Series 1 from the OED
Wordhunt from the OED
Balderdash and Piffle from the BBC

References 
Crowdsourcing
English etymology
Oxford English Dictionary